State Route 374 (SR 374) is a west–east state highway in Montgomery County, Tennessee that acts as a cross-town arterial road for travelers in Clarksville, Tennessee.

Route description 
SR 374 starts at one end in southeast Clarksville (near Sango) at US 41A, and heads northwest, then west, then south becoming:
 
Richview Road, which past Memorial Drive changes into 
Warfield Boulevard to the junction of Wilma Rudolph Boulevard (US 79), changing to the 
101st Airborne Division Parkway, to Fort Campbell Boulevard (US 41A), to the west becoming 
Purple Heart Parkway to Lafayette Road, changing to
Paul B. Huff Memorial Parkway (unsigned, not to be confused with Paul Huff Parkway in Cleveland, Tennessee) to its end at Dover Road (US 79). 

The route forms a northern loop around central Clarksville. Warfield Boulevard and Richview Road are both two-lane sections; and the 101st Parkway, the Purple Heart Parkway, and the Paul B. Huff Parkway are all four-lane limited-access sections, meeting the federal (MUTCD) definition of an expressway. The expressway features three interchanges: a single-point urban interchange with Wilma Rudolph Boulevard US 79, a variation of the partial cloverleaf interchange with Fort Campbell Boulevard (US 41A), and an uncompleted trumpet-like western terminus at Dover Road (US 79).

Warfield Boulevard is named for a family that owned the land before it was constructed there.

Future

Construction is complete along the 101st Parkway segment of SR 374, which widened that part of the highway to four lanes and created an overpass with exits that allow traffic to freely flow over Wilma Rudolph Boulevard. Additional plans call for expansion of Warfield Boulevard on the southwest side of Clarksville sometime in the future and to Palmyra beyond US 79 on the Northwest side of Clarksville. A proposal to extend SR 374 past its current Dover Road terminus, across the Cumberland River to SR 149. A community meeting was held in November 2010, (updated) As of July 6, 2020 the Tenneessee Department of Transportation [TDOT] had conductucted the proper FONSI survey and had approved the extension and there is no date yet set for construction to begin.

Major intersections  
Milepoints listed in this table is an estimate of the distance between the western terminus and the junction in question.

References

External links
Tennessee Department of Transportation
Approved Extension by The Tennessee Department of Transportation

374
Transportation in Montgomery County, Tennessee
Transportation in Clarksville, Tennessee